The A446 is an A road in Zone 4 of the Great Britain numbering scheme.

History
The 1922 route of the A446 was Leamington – Kenilworth – Coleshill – Lichfield, which over the years has been curtailed to its current route.

Route

Stonebridge – Bassets Pole
The A446 starts as a dual carriageway south of Coleshill off the A452. It crosses the M6 at junction 4, almost immediately the road takes the course of the Coleshill bypass, the former route going through the centre of the town. There are 2 roundabouts on the bypass, one of which is the former route of the A47. North of Coleshill the route becomes single carriageway and runs parallel to the M42, eventually crossing it at junction 9. From here to Bassets Pole, the route is single carriageway, running alongside the M6 Toll. The road terminates at the Bassets Pole roundabout, meeting the A38 and A453.

Former routes

Bypasses and Realignments
 Coleshill (Now bypassed by a dual carriageway to the West)

Downgrading
 Bassets Pole – Lichfield (Now part of A38)

References

External links
 SABRE Roads by 10 – A446

Roads in England
Roads in Warwickshire
Roads in the West Midlands (county)
Roads in Worcestershire
Coleshill, Warwickshire